Khimiya i Zhizn – XXI Vek (Chemistry and Life – 21st Century) is a Russian popular scientific monthly magazine, known as simply Khimiya i Zhizn during Soviet times.

The first issue of the magazine was published in April, 1965, with the circulation of 12,500. Lately this figure reached 150,000. Since 1997 the magazine is known as Khimiya i Zhizn – XXI Vek.

External links
Official website (in Russian)

1965 establishments in the Soviet Union
Magazines established in 1965
Popular science magazines
Russian-language magazines
Monthly magazines published in Russia
Science and technology magazines published in Russia
Magazines published in the Soviet Union